The 2014 season is Sarpsborg 08's 3rd season in Tippeligaen, following their return to the top level in 2012. It is also their second, and final, season with Brian Deane as the club's manager, after he announced he would be leaving the club at the end of the season.

Squad

Transfers

Winter

In:

Out:

Summer

In:

Out:

Competitions

Tippeligaen

Results summary

Results by round

Results

Table

Norwegian Cup

Squad statistics

Appearances and goals

|-
|colspan="14"|Players away from Sarpsborg 08 on loan:
|-
|colspan="14"|Players who left Sarpsborg 08 during the season:

|}

Goal scorers

Disciplinary record

References

Sarpsborg 08 FF seasons
Sarpsborg 08